Isauria ( or), in ancient geography, is a rugged, isolated, district in the interior of Asia Minor, of very different extent at different periods, but generally covering what is now the district of Bozkır and its surroundings in the Konya Province of Turkey, or the core of the Taurus Mountains. In its coastal extension it bordered on Cilicia.

It derives its name from the contentious Isaurian tribe and twin settlements Isaura Palaea (Ἰσαυρα Παλαιά, Latin: Isaura Vetus 'Old Isaura') and Isaura Nea (Ἰσαυρα Νέα, Latin: Isaura Nova 'New Isaura').
 
Isaurian marauders were fiercely independent mountain people who created havoc in neighboring districts under Macedonian and Roman occupations.

History

Early 
The permanent nucleus of Isauria was north of the Taurus range which lies directly to south of Iconium and Lystra. Lycaonia had all the Iconian plain; but Isauria began as soon as the foothills were reached. Its two original towns, Isaura Nea and Isaura Palaea, lay, one among these foothills (Doria) and the other on the watershed (Zengibar Kalesi), located at approximately 37°29′N 32°12′E near Bozkir.

In the 4th century BC, Isauria was the wild district about Isaura Palaea and the heads of the Calycadnus. When the capital, Isaura (also known as Isaura Vetus or Isaura Palaea), a strongly fortified city at the foot of Mt. Taurus, was besieged by Perdiccas, the Macedonian regent after Alexander the Great's death, the Isaurians set the place alight and let it perish in flames rather than submit to capture.

Roman rule 

When the Romans first encountered the Isaurians (early in the 1st century BC), they regarded Cilicia Trachea as part of Isauria, which thus extended to the Mediterranean Sea; and this extension of the name continued to be in common use for two centuries. The whole basin of the Calycadnus was reckoned Isaurian, and the cities in the valley of its southern branch formed what was known as the Isaurian Decapolis.

The Isaurians were brought partially under control (76–75 BC) by the Romans.  During the war of the Cilician and other pirates against Rome, the Isaurians took so active a part that the proconsul P. Servilius deemed it necessary to follow them into their rugged strongholds, and compel the whole people to submission, an exploit for which he received the title of Isauricus (75 BC).

In the year AD 6, Cassius Dio mentions that the Isaurians were marauding through the province of Asia until they were faced with open war and were defeated.

The Isaurians were afterwards placed for a time under the rule of Amyntas, king of Galatia; but it is evident that they continued to retain their predatory habits and virtual independence. In the 3rd century they sheltered the rebel emperor Trebellianus.

In the early 4th century, all Cilicia was detached by order of Diocletian for administrative purposes from the northern slope of Taurus, and we find a province called at first Isauria-Lycaonia, and later Isauria alone, extending up to the limits of Galatia, but not passing Taurus on the south. Pisidia, part of which had hitherto been included in one province with Isauria, was also detached, and made to include Iconium; Isauria received the eastern part of Pamphylia. The coastal Metropolis of Seleucia was designated as Isauria's provincial capital.

In the 4th century they were still described by Ammianus Marcellinus as the scourge of the neighbouring provinces of Asia Minor, with a major series of raids occurring from AD 404 to 409, including one campaign to eradicate them led by the Eastern Roman general Arbazacius, but they were said to have been effectually subdued in the reign of Justinian I.

Several Byzantine emperors were of Isaurian descent: Zeno, whose native name was Tarasicodissa Rousoumbladadiotes, Leontios who reigned from 695 to 698, Leo III, who ascended the throne of Constantinople in 718, reigned until 741, and his son Constantine V. The empire used Isaurians as soldiers, generals and at one point they even formed part of the emperor's personal guard, the Excubitores.  However, the population of Constantinople considered the Isaurians as barbarians, and emperor Anastasius I had to fight a long war against Isaurian rebels (Isaurian War, 492–497).

Later 
The ruins of Isaura Palaea are mainly remarkable for their fine situation, fortifications and tombs. Those of Isaura Nea have disappeared, but numerous inscriptions and many sculpture stelae, built into the houses of Dorla, prove the site. It was the latter, and not the former town, that Servilius reduced by cutting off the water supply. J. R. S. Sterrett explored in the highland of Isauria in 1885 but it was not exhaustive. The site was identified by W. M. Ramsay in 1901.

Ramsay discovered there more than fifty Greek inscriptions, the greater number Christian, as well as magnificent tombs. These monuments date from the third, fourth, and fifth centuries.

Ecclesiastical history 
It is argued that Paul evangelised in Claudiopolis, the only Roman colony in the region by that time.

The Isaurian church was originally under the authority of the Patriarch of Antioch, but was attached to the Patriarch of Constantinople in the late 7th or early 8th century.

Because Aetius, fl 451. is called in inscriptions bishop of Isauropolis and Isaura Palaea and as no Notitia episcopatuum makes mention of Isaura, or Isauropolis, Ramsay supposes that the Diocese of Isaura Nova was early joined with that of Leontopolis, the more recent name of Isaura Palaea which is mentioned in all the "Notitiae".

See also 
 Ancient regions of Anatolia
 Olba (ancient city) – Hellenistic period city in Isauria.

References 

 
Late Roman provinces
States and territories established in the 4th century
Provinces of the Byzantine Empire